Xue Hanqin (born 15 September 1955) is a Chinese jurist at the International Court of Justice. On 29 June 2010, she was elected to fill the vacancy created by Shi Jiuyong's resignation on 28 May 2010. She is one of three female judges serving on the International Court of Justice (ICJ) and one of only four women elected as members of the Court to date. Xue is the fifth Chinese judge at the ICJ, and the third representing the People's Republic of China (see Judges of the International Court of Justice).

Having been re-elected to the Court in 2011 and 2020, Xue's term will expire on 5 February 2030. On the sixth of February 2012, Xue was appointed Vice President of the International Court of Justice.

Education 
Xue Hanqin received a Bachelor of Arts from Beijing Foreign Studies University in 1980 and a graduate diploma in international law from Peking University in 1982. She received a Master of Laws and a Doctor of the Science of Law from Columbia Law School in 1983 and 1995, respectively.

Career
From 1980 to 2003, Xue served in the Department of Treaty and Law of the Ministry of Foreign Affairs of China, eventually rising to the position of Director-General. She returned to Columbia Law School in 1991 and obtained a Doctor of Juridical Science in 1995. Xue was appointed the Chinese ambassador to the Netherlands in 2003 and served until 2008. In December 2008, she became the first Chinese ambassador to the Association of Southeast Asian Nations. 

She was elected to the International Court of Justice in June 2010. Xue was sworn in as a member of the ICJ on 13 September 2010. She is currently a member of the Curatorium of The Hague Academy of International Law. On 6 February 2018, Xue was appointed Vice President of the International Court of Justice. In November 2020, she was re-elected to the ICJ for another nine-year term. On 16 March 2022, along with Russian judge Kirill Gevorgian, Xue voted against the provisional order that called for the Russian Federation to suspend military operations in Ukraine.

Lectures
 Transboundary Damage in International Law in the Lecture Series of the United Nations Audiovisual Library of International Law
 国际法上的跨界损害问题 in the Lecture Series of the United Nations Audiovisual Library of International Law
 Special Panel in Honour of Professor R.P. Anand in the Lecture Series of the United Nations Audiovisual Library of International Law

References

External links
 International Court of Justice Profile
 Female judges bring new perspective to ICJ — Radio Netherlands Worldwide

1955 births
Ambassadors of China to the Netherlands
Chinese women judges
Columbia Law School alumni
The Hague Academy of International Law people
International Court of Justice judges
Living people
Peking University alumni
People's Republic of China politicians from Shanghai
Chinese women diplomats
Chinese women ambassadors
Chinese judges of United Nations courts and tribunals
Members of the International Law Commission